Reeta-Mari Kolkkala (born 21 January 1969) is a Finnish orienteering competitor and world champion.

She won a gold medal in the relay event at the 1995 World Orienteering Championships in Detmold, finished 4th in 1997, received a silver medal in 1999, and another gold medal in Tampere in 2001 with the Finnish relay team. She finished 6th in the classic course in 1999. She received an individual bronze medal in the classic course in Tampere in 2001, and finished 5th in the sprint and 5th in the short course.

World cup
She finished 9th overall in the World cup 1994, 15th in 1996, 4th in 1998, and 7th in 2000.

See also
 Finnish orienteers
 List of orienteers
 List of orienteering events

References

External links
 
 Reeta Kolkkala at World of O Runners

1969 births
Living people
Finnish orienteers
Female orienteers
Foot orienteers
World Orienteering Championships medalists
Competitors at the 2001 World Games